Princess Ansu (Hangul: 안수궁주 or 안수공주, Hanja: 安壽宮主 or 安壽公主), also known as Princess Sunjeong was a Goryeo Royal Princess as the third daughter of King Sukjong and Queen Myeongui who firstly received her title in 1105 (10th years reign of her father) and was given the "Ansu Palace" (안수궁, 安壽宮) as her own mansion after her eldest brother's ascension in the same year. She later married her half uncle's son–Wang Won the Duke Gwangpyeong (광평공 왕원) and had a son, Wang Gyeong the Duke Anpyeong (안평공 왕경) who would marry Ansu's niece–Princess Heunggyeong (흥경공주).

References

안수궁주 on Goryeosa .

Goryeo princesses
Year of death unknown
Year of birth unknown
12th-century Korean women